Erigeron altaicus is an Asian species of flowering plants in the family Asteraceae. It is native to Siberia, Kazakhstan, and Xinjiang.

Erigeron altaicus is a perennial, clump-forming herb up to 50 cm (20 inches) tall. Its flower heads have lilac ray florets surrounding yellow disc florets.

References

altaicus
Flora of Asia
Plants described in 1940